The University of Western Macedonia (UoWM; Greek: Πανεπιστήμιο Δυτικής Μακεδονίας) is a multi-campus university in Western Macedonia region of Greece. It was founded in Kozani in 2003 (Presidential Decree No. 92 / 11-4-2003). In 2019, the University of Western Macedonia was merged with the Technological Education Institute of Western Macedonia (Law 4610/2019, Government Gazette 70 / A / 07.05.2019).

The University of Western Macedonia operates with 7 Schools and 22 Departments, located in 5 cities (Kozani, Florina, Kastoria, Ptolemaida, Grevena) in the Region of Western Macedonia.

History 
The University of Western Macedonia was founded in Kozani in 2003 (Presidential Decree No. 92 / 11-4-2003). The first members of the Interim University Administration were appointed under the Ministerial decision F.120.61 / 132/61865 / B2 / 25.6.2003.

In 2015, after the first elections for a Rector, the University of Western Macedonia became a self-governing institution, and ran courses in 2 cities, Kozani and Florina, with 3 Schools (Education, Engineering and Fine Arts) and 6 Departments.

In 2019, the University of Western Macedonia was merged with the Technological Education Institute of Western Macedonia (Law 4610/2019, Government Gazette 70 / A / 07.05.2019). The TEI of Western Macedonia had originally been founded as a Centre for Higher Technical - Vocational Education (KATEE, in Greek). Later (1983) when Centres for Higher Technical-Vocational Education were replaced by Technological Educational Institutions as part of tertiary education in Greece, the Technological Educational Institute of Kozani was established, which was later (1999) renamed to Technological Educational Institute of Western Macedonia, with 5 Schools and 11 Departments in 5 cities in Western Macedonia (the central campus was located in Kozani).

The new University of Western Macedonia runs 7 Schools and 21 Departments in 5 cities (Kozani, Florina, Kastoria, Ptolemaida, and Grevena).

A new campus was constructed in the Active Urban Planning Zone (ZEP) of Kozani and started operating in September 2022.

Schools and departments
The new university runs 7 Schools and 21 Departments in 5 cities (Kozani, Florina, Kastoria, Ptolemaida, and Grevena), offering undergraduate and postgraduate study programmes.

Research
Research is conducted by graduate students and members of the faculty, as well as associated researchers.

In April 2018, the students from the Hyperion Robotics team at the University of Western Macedonia presented an automated system with AI algorithms called "Cronus" claimed to be unbeatable at chess. The project took four months, the idea came from the Dean of the Polytechnic School, Professor Theodoros Theodoulides who is a chess player.

In March 2019, it was announced that the University of Western Macedonia, among 18 research institutes and companies from seven countries (Denmark, Greece, Spain, Norway, Poland, Portugal, and Switzerland), takes part in the project of European Commission's Horizon 2020 programme for research and training in 5G mobile networks, named TeamUp5G. Coordinated by UC3M, the project is being carried out, within the framework of the Marie Sklodowska-Curie Innovative Training Networks, between the year 2019 and 2022.

Academic evaluation
In 2016 the external evaluation committee gave University of Western Macedonia a Positive evaluation.

An external evaluation of all academic departments in Greek universities was conducted by the Hellenic Quality Assurance and Accreditation Agency (HQA).

See also
 List of universities in Greece
 List of research institutes in Greece
 Aristotle University of Thessaloniki, the largest university in the Balkans, established in 1925.
 University of Ioannina, a university established in the city of Ioannina, established in 1970.
 Technological Educational Institute of Western Macedonia
 Education in Greece
 Academic grading in Greece

References

Universities in Greece
Educational institutions established in 2004
Kozani
Education in Western Macedonia
Buildings and structures in Western Macedonia
2004 establishments in Greece